Craiova railway station is an important terminus in the south of Romania and the main station in the region of Oltenia.  The railway  station was inaugurated in 1875.

This station is served by routes from the Bucharest, Transylvania, Banat and Constanţa and international routes from Budapest, Belgrade, Vienna, Munich and Varna. As of 2008 more than 120 passenger trains are served by the station.

Services
Bucharest - Roşiorii de Vede - Craiova - Drobeta Turnu Severin - Caransebeş - Timişoara Nord
Craiova - Piteşti - Craiova
Craiova - Filiaşi - Târgu Jiu - Petroşani - Simeria
Craiova - Calafat

External links
Trains timetable

Railway stations in Romania
Buildings and structures in Craiova
1875 establishments in Romania
19th-century architecture in Romania